|- bgcolor="#FFFAFA" 

PSR J2124−3358 is a millisecond pulsar located in the constellation Microscopium. It is one of the brightest examples of its type in the X-ray spectrum. Discovered in 1997, no optical component was observed in 2003.

References

Microscopium
Pulsars